Megachile deanii is a species of bee in the family Megachilidae. It was described by Rayment in 1935.

References

Deanii
Insects described in 1935